Joint Readiness Training Center may refer to:

 Fort Polk (Vernon Parish, Louisiana), the current home of the Joint Readiness Training Center
 Fort Chaffee (Fort Smith, Arkansas), the home of the Joint Readiness Training Center from 1987 to 1993
 Fort Lewis (Tacoma, Washington)
 Fort Bliss (El Paso, Texas)